Brandon Christopher Hiini (born 11 December 1981) is a New Zealand cricketer who plays for Canterbury. He was born in Invercargill.

In 2007 Brandon took up a professional contract with the Enfield Cricket Club who play in the Lancashire Cricket league.

Hiini played for Canterbury, Northern Districts, NZ A and NZ emerging teams. On his First Class debut he took 5 wickets for Canterbury v Central Districts. He then followed up with his maiden First Class Hundred v Northern Districts at Seddon Park in just his 2nd game. He also was named bowler of the tournament for the 2009 Emerging Players Tournament held in Brisbane featuring NZ, Australia, India and South Africa.

These teams featured the likes of Virat Kohli and David Warner and the NZ Side consisting of Trent Boult, BJ Watling and James Franklin.

References

External links
 
 https://web.archive.org/web/20070927182850/http://www.world-a-team.net/content/view/94/28/ Interview by www.world-a-team.com with Brandon Hiini

1981 births
Living people
New Zealand cricketers
Canterbury cricketers
Northern Districts cricketers